The Koyikkal Palace is a palace situated in Nedumangadu, Thiruvananthapuram District, Kerala, India.  The palace was built in 16th century for Umayamma Rani of the Venad Royal Family.  Umayamma Rani was the queen of Venad between 1677 and 1684.  The palace is a double storied building and built in the traditional architectural style of Kerala.

The palace is maintained by the Kerala State Department of Archaeology, and also hosts folklore and a numismatic museums.  The exhibits in the museum contains such rare instruments as the "Chandravalam", a small percussion instrument used in Ramakathappattu; and the "Nanthuni", a small musical instrument made of wood and string used in Onappattu.

References

External links 

Mathrubhumi Website

Palaces in Thiruvananthapuram
Museums in Thiruvananthapuram
Numismatic museums in India
Monuments of National Importance in Kerala
Buildings and structures completed in 1677